Xie Baoxian (born 9 January 1997) is a Chinese footballer currently playing as a midfielder.

Club career
Xie Baoxian was promoted to the senior team of Shenzhen within the 2018 China League One season, but he would have to wait until 12 May 2019 to make his debut, which was in a league game against Beijing Guoan F.C. that ended in a 3-0 defeat.

Career statistics

References

External links

1997 births
Living people
Chinese footballers
Association football midfielders
China League One players
Chinese Super League players
Shenzhen F.C. players
Guangxi Pingguo Haliao F.C. players